For rugby tours see:
Rugby union tours
:Category:National rugby union team tours
:Category:Rugby league tours